Pragativadi is an Indian Odia language daily newspaper published from Bhubaneswar. This is one of the most circulated news dailies in Odisha. Founded in the year 1985 by Pradyumna Bal, currently it is being edited by Samahit Bal. The newspaper also has a news website and an online version of the printed newspapers freely available to internet users.

References

Newspapers published in Bhubaneswar
Odia-language newspapers
Publications established in 1985
1985 establishments in Orissa